Domi Kumbela (born 20 April 1984), also known by his nickname Dominick, is a Congolese former professional footballer who played as a striker.

Club career
Kumbela began his senior career at 1. FC Kaiserslautern's reserve side. After the club cancelled his contract in 2005 for cannabis use, Kumbela joined Regionalliga Nord side FC Rot-Weiß Erfurt. He was fired by Erfurt in 2007, when he was charged with battery after a night club brawl, an incident for which he was later sentenced to probation and a 16,000 Euro fine. Kumbela went on to play for Eintracht Braunschweig and SC Paderborn 07. After being released from Paderborn on 7 July 2009, he signed a contract with Rot Weiss Ahlen two days later. After six months in Ahlen he returned to Eintracht Braunschweig on 8 January 2010.

During his second stint in Braunschweig, Kumbela became a prolific goal scorer for the club and contributed significantly to his team's promotions from the 3. Liga to the 2. Bundesliga in 2011, and from the 2. Bundesliga to the Bundesliga in 2013. On 3 July 2014, Kumbela joined the Turkish Süper Lig side Karabükspor.

Kumbela returned to Germany for the season 2015–16 season, where he joined 2. Bundesliga side SpVgg Greuther Fürth. After six months in Fürth, his contract was terminated by mutual agreement. Kumbela then rejoined his old club Eintracht Braunschweig.

International career
In December 2012 Kumbela was included in the Democratic Republic of the Congo's preliminary squad for the 2013 Africa Cup of Nations in South Africa, but declined the invitation to concentrate on club football.

Personal life
Kumbela and his family came to Pforzheim, West Germany in the mid-1980s, as refugees from Zaire. In 2013, he took part in the anti-racism campaign Elf gegen Rassismus for Show Racism the Red Card Deutschland.

Honours
Individual
 2. Bundesliga top scorer: 2013
 3. Liga top scorer: 2011
 Sportschau Goal of the Month: March 2014
 Northern German Sportsperson of the Year (Nordsportler des Jahres): 2011

References

External links

Dominick Kumbela at kicker.de 

1984 births
Living people
Footballers from Kinshasa
Democratic Republic of the Congo emigrants to Germany
Democratic Republic of the Congo footballers
Association football forwards
Bundesliga players
Süper Lig players
2. Bundesliga players
3. Liga players
FK Pirmasens players
1. FC Kaiserslautern II players
FC Rot-Weiß Erfurt players
Eintracht Braunschweig players
SC Paderborn 07 players
Rot Weiss Ahlen players
Kardemir Karabükspor footballers
SpVgg Greuther Fürth players
Expatriate footballers in Turkey